, better known by her stage name Machiko or Machico, is a Japanese singer and voice actress from Kure, Hiroshima. After participating in an audition organized by Horipro, she made her music debut in 2012, singing a theme song for a PC game. She was cast as the character Tsubasa Ibuki in the mobile game The Idolmaster Million Live! in 2013. Apart from voice acting, she has performed theme songs for KonoSuba and Age 12. Machico released two albums between 2014 and 2015, and opened her official fanclub in late 2016.

She left her seiyuu agency HoriPro International in 30 November 2022 and announced her new activity under Style Cube the next day.

Biography
Machico's career began after she participated in the 36th Horipro Talent Scout Campaign in 2011, where she was a finalist. Although she was not declared the campaign's winner, she would make her media debut in 2012 when she was chosen to perform the song "Magical Happy Show!", which was used as the theme song to the 2012 visual novel Supipara: Alice the Magic Conductor; the single for "Magical Happy Show!" was released on May 23, 2012. She is still represented by HoriPro International talent agency.

Machico debuted as a voice actress in 2013 when she was cast as the character Tsubasa Ibuki in the mobile game The Idolmaster Million Live! in 2013. The following year, she released her first album titled Colors, which was released on June 11, 2014; the album peaked at number 64 on the Oricon weekly charts. Her second album Colors II -RML- was released on April 8, 2015; the album peaked at number 86 on the Oricon weekly charts. That same year, she voiced the character Sophia Mertesacker in the anime television series World Break: Aria of Curse for a Holy Swordsman. She made a cameo as herself in the 2015 anime television series Seiyu's Life!.

Machico performed the song "Fantastic Dreamer", which was used as the opening theme to the 2016 anime television series KonoSuba; the single for "Fantastic Dreamer" was released on January 27, 2016, and it peaked at number 42 on the Oricon weekly charts. Her next single,  was released on November 9, 2016; the title track is used as the second ending theme to the anime television series Age 12. She portrayed the character Serina Nishiyama in the 2016 anime television series Three Leaves, Three Colors. She opened her official fanclub ZO≒NA in December 2016. Her fourth single "Tomorrow" was released on February 1, 2017; the title track is used as the opening theme to the second season of KonoSuba. She was cast as the character Icea Mize Valgalis in the 2017 anime television series WorldEnd. Her fifth single  was released on January 31, 2018; the title track is used as the opening theme to the anime series The Ryuo's Work Is Never Done!. She also played the role of Tokai Teio in the multimedia franchise Uma Musume Pretty Derby.

Machico had a recurring role as Ayane Misaki in Kirakira PreCure a la Mode, the fourteenth season of the Pretty Cure franchise. She sang the ending theme of the franchise's seventeenth season Healin' Good PreCure, and the opening theme of Tropical-Rouge! Pretty Cure and Delicious Party Pretty Cure. She also played the role of Hikari Kokura, the protagonist of the anime series Rifle is Beautiful; she and her co-stars performed the series' opening theme "Let's go! Rifling 4!!!!" and ending theme "Yūyake Friends" under the name Rifling 4.

Discography

Singles

Albums

Filmography

Television animation
Seiyu's Life! (2015), Machiko
World Break: Aria of Curse for a Holy Swordsman (2015), Sophia Mertesacker

Three Leaves, Three Colors (2016), Serina Nishiyama
Kirakira PreCure a la Mode (2017), Ayane Misaki
WorldEnd (2017), Ithea Myse Valgulious
Uma Musume Pretty Derby (2018), Tōkai Teiō
Chidori RSC (2019), Hikari Kokura
Iwa-Kakeru! -Sport Climbing Girls- (2020), Kurea Ooba
Magia Record, Sayuki Fumino (ep.3)
Uma Musume Pretty Derby Season 2 (2021), Tōkai Teiō
Fuuto PI (2022), Moriguchi Monako
Farming Life in Another World (2023), Sena

Anime films
Idol Bu Show (2022), Hikaru Fuwa
Guardy Girls (2022), Laurie

Video games
The Idolmaster Million Live! (2013), Tsubasa Ibuki
The Idolmaster Million Live!: Theater Days (2017), Tsubasa Ibuki
Magia Record: Puella Magi Madoka Magica Side Story (2019), Sayuki Fumino
Project Sekai: Colorful Stage feat. Hatsune Miku (2020), Nene Kusanagi
The Idolmaster: Starlit Season (2020), Tsubasa Ibuki
Uma Musume Pretty Derby (2021), Tōkai Teiō
Fate/Grand Order (2021), Nazo no Ranmaru X
Muse Dash (2022), Kirisame Marisa

Drama CD
The Idolmaster Million Live! (2015-present), Tsubasa Ibuki

References

External links
 Official website 
 Official agency profile (HoriPro International) 
 Official artist profile at Geneon Universal 
 Official artist profile at Nihon Colombia 
 

1992 births
Living people
Japanese women pop singers
Japanese voice actresses
Anime musicians
Nippon Columbia artists
Musicians from Hiroshima Prefecture
Voice actresses from Hiroshima Prefecture
21st-century Japanese women singers
21st-century Japanese singers